This is a list of minister from Manohar Parrikar cabinets starting from 9 March 2012 to 8 November 2014. Manohar Parrikar is the leader of Bharatiya Janata Party was sworn in the Chief Ministers of Goa in 9 March 2012.

Parrikar led government of Bharatiya Janata Party and Maharashtrawadi Gomantak Party which were in alliance before the polls.

Parrikar along with five minister from Bharatiya Janata Party and one minister from Maharashtrawadi Gomantak Party were inducted into cabinet.

Shortly after the election, Bharatiya Janata Party MLA from Cortalim and Minister for forest José Matanhy de Saldanha died of heart attack. His wife, Alina Saldanha won Cortalim by elections and was given her husbands portfolios.

Here is the list of the ministers of his ministry.

Ministers 

 Manohar Parrikar - Chief Minister
 Francis D'Souza - Deputy Chief Minister
 Dayanand Mandrekar - Minister of Civil Supplies and Price Control, Water Resources, Archives & Archaeology, Art & Culture 
 Laxmikant Parsekar - Minister of Health
 Sudin Dhavalikar - Minister of Public Works Department, Transport, River Navigation, Cooperation
 Mahadev Naik
 Milind Naik
 Ramesh Tawadkar
 Dilip Parulekar
 Deepak Dhavalikar
 Avertano Furtado
 Alina Saldanha - Minister of Tourism, Science, Forest and Environment

Former Ministers 

 José Matanhy de Saldanha - Minister of Rural Development, Science, Forest and Environment

See also 

 Government of Goa
 Goa Legislative Assembly

References

Bharatiya Janata Party state ministries
Maharashtrawadi Gomantak Party
Goa ministries
Cabinets established in 2012
2012 establishments in Goa
2014 disestablishments in India
Cabinets disestablished in 2014